Vishama Bhaga is a 2019 Sri Lankan Sinhala drama film directed by Lalith Rathnayake and produced by Ven. Aludeniye Subodhi Thero for Shraddha Film Productions. It stars twin brothers Pankaja Wickramarathna and Pansilu Wickramarathna in lead child roles with Jackson Anthony, Kaushalya Fernando and Hemasiri Liyanage in supportive roles. Music composed by Chamara Ruwanthilake. The film received positive reviews from critics and has been selected for more than 60 official award selections at international film festivals. 

The film considered to raise funds for "Pure Water for All" charity project to reduced chronic kidney disease in Sri Lanka. The film premiered at the 2019 Shanghai International Film Festival and later showed at Savoy Premier, Wellawatte on 15 December 2019. In December 2020, the film has been uploaded to the internet for the free viewing.

Plot
In a rural village in Sri Lanka, the family well becomes poisoned by agricultural chemicals. This subsequently leads to the untimely death of Ruwansiri's father who develops chronic kidney disease, leaving his mother works to support the family. At school, he struggles to understand his lessons in a rigid educational system that cannot go beyond rote learning. As an escape from the toxic environment around him, Ruwansiri finds solace in music.

Cast
 Jackson Anthony as Hemachandra
 Kaushalya Fernando as Heen Manika
 Hemasiri Liyanage as Madiris
 Thilakshini Ratnayake as Sakunthala
 Priyantha Sirikumara as Bandara
 Pankaja Wickramarathna as Kamalsiri
 Pansilu Wickramarathna as Ruwansiri

Production
Shooting of the film was completed in 2018 and the post production process was completed in early 2019.

Acclaim
The Other Half was among the best five films at the 22nd Shanghai International Film Festival in June 2019 and nominated for the Best Script Writer Award in the Asia New Talent Awards. The film won the First Time Director (Feature), Best Narrative Feature and Best Picture awards at the Festigious International Film Festival in Los Angeles. At the same festival, Pansilu Wickramaratna won the Best Young Actor award and Kaushalya Fernando won the Best Supporting Actress award. 

The film won the titles of Best Supporting Actor by Jackson Anthony, Best Cinematographer by Palitha Perera, Best Director by Lalith Ratnayake and Best Narrative Film at Asian Cinematography International Film Festival in the Philippines. 

In January 2020, Jackson Anthony won the award for the Best supporting actor at Fox International Film Festival held at Kolkata, India. In October 2020, director Lalith Rathnayake won the Award for Best Director at the Ostia International Film Festival.

The film won its 50th international award at the Out of the Can Film Festival in Britain. The film won the Best Producer for Ven. Aludeniye Subodhi Thero and nominated for the Best Non English Speaking Film and the Best Producer awards.

Songs
The film consists with one song and two poems. The song was composed by Lalith Ratnayake and poems composed by K.A. Milton Perera.

References

External links
 
 The Other Half on Vimeo

2019 films
2010s Sinhala-language films
2019 drama films
Sri Lankan drama films